Alessandro Speranza (1728 - 17 November 1797) was an Italian composer. His opera I due Figaro was very popular during his lifetime and enjoyed revivals in Italy after his death well into the 19th century; including at La Scala in 1840 with Raffaele Scalese in the title role.

References

1728 births
1797 deaths
Italian male classical composers
Italian opera composers
Male opera composers
18th-century Italian composers
18th-century Italian male musicians